hiQ Labs, Inc. v. LinkedIn Corp., 938 F.3d 985 (9th Cir. 2019), was a United States Ninth Circuit case about web scraping. The 9th Circuit affirmed the district court's preliminary injunction, preventing LinkedIn from denying the plaintiff, hiQ Labs, from accessing LinkedIn's publicly available LinkedIn member profiles. hiQ is a small data analytics company that used automated bots to scrape information from public LinkedIn profiles. 

The court ruled for hiQ and the right to do web scraping. However, the Supreme Court, based on its Van Buren v. United States decision, vacated the decision and remanded the case for further review in June 2021. 
In a second ruling in April 2022 the Ninth Circuit affirmed its decision. In a November 2022 ruling the Ninth Circuit ruled that hiQ had breached LinkedIn's User Agreement and a settlement agreement was reached between the two parties.

Background
LinkedIn served hiQ with a cease-and-desist, demanding that hiQ cease its activity of accessing and copying data from LinkedIn's server. hiQ filed suit against LinkedIn, seeking both injunctive relief under California law and a declaratory judgment to prevent LinkedIn from lawfully invoking the Computer Fraud and Abuse Act (CFAA), the Digital Millennium Copyright Act (DMCA), California Penal Code § 502(c), or the common law of trespass against hiQ.

Ninth Circuit
The Ninth Circuit affirmed the district court's award of a preliminary injunction in hiQ's favor, finding that "hiQ established a likelihood of irreparable harm because the survival of its business was threatened." 

The Ninth Circuit held that there was no abuse of discretion by the district court where the court had found that even if some LinkedIn users retained their privacy despite their public status, as they were not scraped, such privacy interests did not outweigh hiQ's interest in maintaining its business. 

In balancing the hardships, the Ninth Circuit determined it weighed in favor of hiQ. Further, the Ninth Circuit noted that hiQ posed serious concerns with regards to "(1) the merits of its claim for tortious interference with contract, alleging that LinkedIn intentionally interfered with its contracts with third parties, and (2) the merits of LinkedIn’s legitimate business purpose defense." 

Additionally, there was a serious contention as to whether the CFAA preempted hiQ's state law causes of action, specifically because the CFAA prohibits accessing a computer without authorization or exceeding one's authorization to obtain information from a protected computer. LinkedIn asserted that following the receipt of its cease-and-desist letter, hiQ's scraping and further use of its data without authorization fell within the meaning of "without authorization" within the CFAA. 

The Ninth Circuit affirmed the district court's finding that public interest favored the granting of a preliminary injunction. In his concurring opinion, Judge Wallace specified his concern about the appeal of a preliminary injunction initiated in order to obtain an appellate court's take on the merits. 

Ultimately, the Ninth Circuit's affirmation of the district court's grant of the preliminary injunction prohibited LinkedIn from denying hiQ access to publicly available data on public LinkedIn users' profiles.

Supreme Court
LinkedIn petitioned the Supreme Court to review the Ninth Circuit's decision. In an order on June 14, 2021, the Supreme Court vacated the Ninth Circuit's decision on the basis of their ruling on CFAA the week prior in Van Buren v. United States, which had ruled that the "exceeds authorized access" of CFAA only applies when an individual has valid access to a system but accesses parts of a system they are not intended to access. The case was remanded to the Ninth Circuit for further review under Van Buren.

In a second ruling in April 2022 the Ninth Circuit affirmed its decision.

Implications

The Ninth Circuit's declaration that selectively banning potential competitors from accessing and using data that is publicly available can be considered unfair competition under California law may have large implication for antitrust law. 

Other countries with laws to prevent monopolistic practices or anti-trust laws may also see similar disputes and prospectively judgements hailing commercial use of publicly accessible information. While there is global precedence by virtue of large companies such as Thompson Reuters, Bloomberg or Google effectively using web-scraping or crawling to aggregate information from disparate sources across the web, fundamentally the judgement by Ninth Circuit fortifies the lack of enforceability of browse-wrap agreements over conduct of trade using publicly available information.

References

External links
 

LinkedIn
2019 in United States case law
United States Court of Appeals for the Ninth Circuit cases
Web scraping